Family Fortunes is a British television game show based on the American game show Family Feud. The programme ran on ITV from 6 January 1980 to 30 December 2002. A celebrity version, All Star Family Fortunes, followed from 2006 to 2015. In 2020, the original version of the show returned after 18 years with Gino D'Acampo as host.

The game involves two families providing answers to 'everyday questions' that were surveyed by 100 members of the British public before the show (e.g., 'Name something usually done in the dark.') to win cash prizes (and sometimes mystery prizes for giving a correct answer). The top answers to the surveys are displayed on a large electronic board, christened by Bob Monkhouse as "Mr. Babbage".

Monkhouse was responsible for changing the name of the show to Family Fortunes as he felt that "feud" sounded too aggressive.

Hosts and presentation
Family Fortunes was first hosted by comedian Bob Monkhouse (1980–83), followed by singer and entertainer Max Bygraves (1983–85). The show returned on 27 June 1987 with Les Dennis as presenter and remained on air for the next 15 years. It was then moved to a daily daytime slot, hosted by Andy Collins.

The most well-known aspects of the show are the large computer screen (named "Mr Babbage" by original host Bob Monkhouse) and the famous computerised sound used when wrong answers are given. The computer screen name, "Mr Babbage", was in recognition of the English mathematician, philosopher, inventor and mechanical engineer Charles Babbage, who originated the concept of a programmable computer. During the Monkhouse and Bygraves era, the board was also used to show the closing credits at the end of the episode. In 1987, a completely different board was used for the first Dennis series, however a board similar to the original Mr Babbage one (using flip discs instead) was used from the following year.

Format
Two family teams, each consisting of five members, are asked to guess the results of surveys in which 100 people would be asked open-ended questions (e.g., "We asked 100 people to name something associated with the country Wales" or "We asked 100 people to name a breed of dog"). Although rarely acknowledged during the programme, the 100 people surveyed are invariably audience members who have volunteered before the show or the families themselves who would be asked questions for the next series.

Each round begins with a member of each family (in rotation, meaning all players do this at least once) approaching the podium. As the question is read, the first of the two nominees to hit the buzzer gives an answer. If it is not the most popular answer, the other nominee is asked. If both nominees fail to give an answer that is on the board, the next members of each family are chosen to answer the question, starting in the same order as the first two nominees. The family with the more popular answer then chooses whether to "play" the question or "pass" control to the other family.

The host then passes down the line of the controlling team, asking for an answer from each member. After each answer, the board reveals whether it features. If not or if they can not come up with an answer in time, the family is charged with a strike (marked with an X), losing control of the board upon their third strike (officially known as striking out in the official rules) in the round. If a family manages to come up with all the answers before striking out, they win the amount in pounds of the total number of people who had given the answers.

If a family strikes out, the opponent is given the chance to "steal" by coming up with an answer that may be amongst those missing. Only the head family member (the first family member or the designated captain) may give the answer after consultation. If the answer is present, this family wins the round and is said to have "stolen" the money. Otherwise, the family that plays the board keeps the money.

On celebrity specials, each top answer adds a bonus of £200 (later £250) to that family's charity.

Double Money
Following three rounds before a commercial break (two rounds in series 1), "Double Money" is played. Gameplay is the same as in the first rounds, but each answer is now worth £2 for each person who said it, and there are generally fewer possible answers. The family who passed £300 (£200 in series 1) first goes through to play "Big Money" (known in some overseas versions as "Fast Money") for the jackpot. On the 2020 revival, the fifth and sixth questions score double points and the losing family receives £2 per point and a "Family Fortunes buzzer" doorbell. The winning family would be guaranteed ten times their winning score.

Big Money
This involves two contestants (out of the five in the family team) answering five questions that fit with those given by the "100 people surveyed", with the questions asked within a narrow time limit. The first contestant answers the five questions within 15 seconds (20 in the revival). Then the second contestant (who was out of earshot) answers within 20 seconds (25 in the revival). Each point gives the family £2 (£10 per point in the revival), up to £398 (£1,990 in the revival), and those points would be added to their earlier winnings. If they get 200 points or more from the ten answers, they then win the top cash prize.

From 1994 onwards, a bonus star prize was available for naming all five "top" (most popular) answers and scoring 200 points.

In the 2020 revival, the top answers were not revealed until after the second contestant gave their answers and their point values were shown, an element that was previously seen in the All-Stars version of the show.

Cash and prizes
The top cash prize in "Big Money" during the first series (1980) was £1,000. From the second series (1981), the prize started at £1,000, then rose by £500 weekly if no one won, to a limit of £3,000 (£2,500 from 1981 to 1982), which it could stay at for more than one week if it still was not won. Once the prize was won, it reverted to £1,000 for the next edition. In the 1987 series, it started at £1,000 and, if not won, rose by £1,000 per week to a maximum of £3,000. From the 1988 series, the prize was fixed at £3,000. After the abolition of the IBA's prize limits, the top prize rose to £5,000 from 1996. The money had to be shared out between contestants.

The bonus star prize was always a family car between 1994 and 1998. From 1998 to 2002, contestants had the choice of either a car or a holiday for up to twelve people. The car suppliers were Honda in 1994, SEAT in 1995 and Daewoo between 1996 and 2002. On the all-star specials, 200 points along with all five top responses donated £5,000 to both teams.

During the programme's brief daytime run in 2002, the prize values were reduced significantly. If the contestants scored over 200 points, they won £1,000 and if they found five top answers, it was increased to £3,000. As with the previous prizes, the £3,000 could only be won if the family scored 200+ points.

In the 2020 revival, 200 point wins £10,000, which would be tripled to £30,000 if one or both contestants named all of the top answers.

From the second series in 1981 onward, spot prizes were available in the main game, turning up seemingly at random when certain answers were found.

Transmissions

Original

Revival

Ratings

Series 18

All Star Family Fortunes

A celebrity revival of the show presented by Vernon Kay began airing on 28 October 2006 and ended on 14 June 2015 after its eleventh series.

Format
In this version, the game ends after four rounds (five during the hour-long series with two or three Single and two Double), ignoring the 'first to 300 points' rule that the previous incarnations employed, and the losing family receives a consolation prize of the greater of £1,000 or £10 times their score (£3 per point in series 1). Also in Big Money, the celebrity automatically plays the final, meaning that only one other member needs to be picked. If they get 200 points or more from the ten answers, they win £10,000 for their chosen charity, which would be tripled if they get all five top answers, and if they score less than 200 points, those points plus their earlier score would be multiplied by £10 (£3 per point in series 1).

Transmissions

International versions

International versions which use similar elements to All Star Family Fortunes

References

External links

Family Fortunes at BFI

1980 British television series debuts
2006 British television series debuts
2015 British television series endings
1980s British game shows
1990s British game shows
2000s British game shows
2010s British game shows
2020s British game shows
British television series based on American television series
British television series revived after cancellation
English-language television shows
Family Feud
ITV game shows
Television shows produced by Associated Television (ATV)
Television shows produced by Central Independent Television
Television shows produced by Thames Television
Television series by ITV Studios
Television series by Fremantle (company)
Television shows shot at ATV Elstree Studios